Geza Tatrallyay (born 11 February 1949) is a Canadian fencer and author. He competed in the individual and team épée events at the 1976 Summer Olympics. Tatrallyay was born in Budapest, Hungary in 1949 and escaped with his family in 1956, emigrating to Canada.  He graduated from Harvard University, Oxford University, and London School of Economics.

References

External links
 

1949 births
Living people
Canadian male fencers
Olympic fencers of Canada
Fencers at the 1976 Summer Olympics
Fencers from Budapest
Hungarian emigrants to Canada
Harvard Crimson fencers
Alumni of the University of Oxford
Alumni of the London School of Economics